In The Name Of Love (Chinese: 最爱是你) is a romance drama series produced by MediaCorp Studios and aired on MediaCorp Channel 8. The show aired at 9pm on weekdays and had a repeat telecast at 8am the following day. The series stars Felicia Chin, Pierre Png, Julie Tan, Ann Kok and Bryan Wong as the main characters of the series, it is also a mid year blockbuster drama for 2014. This series repeat telecast every Sunday at 12pm - 2pm.

Cast

Main casts

Supporting casts

Awards and nominations
In The Name Of Love is nominated for 4 awards in Star Awards 2015.

Star Awards 2015

Trivia
Felicia Chin's 9pm comeback drama after Don't Stop Believin' in 2012.
Youyi's second drama series after The Caregivers.
Felicia Chin and Pierre Png's second pair-up after Portrait of Home.

See also
List of MediaCorp Channel 8 Chinese drama series (2010s)
List of In The Name Of Love episodes

References

Singapore Chinese dramas
2014 Singaporean television series debuts
2014 Singaporean television series endings
Channel 8 (Singapore) original programming